The Fall of Eve is a 1929 American comedy film directed by Frank R. Strayer, which stars Patsy Ruth Miller, Ford Sterling, and Gertrude Astor. The screenplay was written by Gladys Lehman, from a story by Anita Loos and John Emerson, and the film was released by Columbia Pictures on June 25, 1929.

Cast list
 Patsy Ruth Miller as Eve Grant
 Ford Sterling as Mr. Mack
 Gertrude Astor as Mrs. Ford
 Arthur Rankin as Tom Ford, Jr.
 Jed Prouty as Tom Ford, Sr.
 Betty Farrington as Mrs. Mack
 Fred Kelsey as Cop
 Bob White as Hank Mann

References

External links
 
 
 

1929 comedy films
1929 films
American comedy films
Columbia Pictures films
Films directed by Frank R. Strayer
American black-and-white films
1920s English-language films
1920s American films